Williams Field or Willy Field  is a United States Antarctic Program airfield in Antarctica. Williams Field consists of two snow runways located on approximately 8 meters (25 ft) of compacted snow, lying on top of 8–10 ft of ice, floating over 550 meters (1,800 ft) of water. The airport, which is approximately seven miles from Ross Island, serves McMurdo Station and New Zealand's Scott Base. Until the 2009–10 summer season, Williams was the major airfield for on-continent aircraft operations in Antarctica.

Williams Field is named in honor of Richard T. Williams, a United States Navy equipment operator who drowned when his D-8 tractor broke through the ice on January 6, 1956. Williams and other personnel were participants in the first Operation Deep Freeze, a U.S. military mission to build a permanent science research station at McMurdo Station in anticipation of the International Geophysical Year 1957–58.

Operation 

The skiway was typically in operation from December through to the end of February. Other McMurdo Station airfields include the Ice Runway (October to December) and Phoenix Airfield.

The Williams Field snow runway is known locally as "Willy's Field". The airfield is a groomed snow surface that can support ski-equipped aircraft landings only. A cluster of facilities for flight operations, referred to as "Willy Town", includes several rows of containers for workers and a galley. Willy Field Tavern, a bar at the airfield, closed in 1994.

Air Traffic Control services are provided by Williams Tower / Approach (Willie Tower), and by McMurdo Center (Mac Center) when the tower is closed.  The McMurdo Weather Office provides weather forecasting for Williams Field while onsite Controllers and Weather Observers provide hourly and special weather observations.

Aviation fuel at Williams Field is pumped in a 16 km (10 mi) flexible pipe from McMurdo Station. Fuel is stored in up to 12 tanks. The fuel tanks, like other structures at the airfield, are mounted on skis or runners for portability. Generator and heating fuel is delivered to the station by fuel trucks from McMurdo Station, with fuels stored at the individual structures.

The extraordinary conditions encountered at Williams Field include the fact that the airfield is in a continuous slow slide towards the sea. Seaward movement of the floating McMurdo Ice Shelf upon which the airfield is constructed has forced Williams Field to be relocated three times since its original construction. Workers last moved the airfield during the 1984–85 season. Subsequently, personnel housed at Williams lived in buildings constructed on sleds to facilitate relocation. In the past, up to 450 people were housed at the airfield, according to the National Science Foundation.  In 1994 the National Science Foundation constructed two dorm buildings at McMurdo Station. Transport to Williams Field uses various vehicles including Foremost Delta II and Ford E-350 vans.

Current aircraft in use
Lockheed LC-130 – New York Air National Guard
Basler BT-67 – Kenn Borek Air
de Havilland Canada DHC-6 Twin Otter – Kenn Borek Air

Historical notes
 
1957: Pan American Boeing 377 Stratocruiser makes round trip from Christchurch to McMurdo Sound. First civilian flight to Antarctica.
1960: U.S. Navy WV-2 BuNo 126513 crashes after landing short of the ice runway.
1960: First ski-equipped C-130 Hercules cargo aircraft lands in Antarctica.
1960: Sunspots knock out radio communications for eight days, forcing cancellation of all flights between New Zealand and McMurdo.
1966: First all-jet aircraft (USAF-C-141) lands at Williams.
1967: Earliest scheduled winter fly-in.
1970: U.S. Navy "Pegasus" C-121J crash lands. Aircraft is destroyed but no fatalities among the 80 persons aboard. Pegasus Field is named after this aircraft.
1979: Air New Zealand Flight 901 crashes on nearby Mount Erebus. 257 people died.

See also
Blue ice runway
Marble Point
McMurdo Sound
McMurdo Station
Pegasus Field
Ice Runway
 List of airports in Antarctica

Notes

References
Change of Command pamphlet. U.S. Naval Support Force Antarctica; June 10, 1991.
Clarke, Peter; On the Ice. Rand McNally & Company, 1966.
United States Antarctic Research Program Calendars: 1983, 1985.
 Where danger and wonder collide, The NewsTribune.com. Tacoma, Wash.; November 20, 2006.

External links 

Aircraft of Antarctica
Moving the Airport, December 21, 1999.
List of stratospheric balloon launches  under NASA's Long Duration Balloon program

Airports in the Ross Dependency
McMurdo Station
Coastal construction
Airports in Antarctica